Steroids is a monthly peer-reviewed international scientific journal covering all aspects of steroid hormones, such as biological aspects of steroidal moieties.

It was established in 1963 and is published by Elsevier. The editors-in-chief are R.B. Hochberg (Yale University) and W. Rosner (Mount Sinai Morningside). According to the Journal Citation Reports, the journal has a 2013 impact factor of 2.716.

References

External links 
 

Endocrinology journals
Publications established in 1963
Elsevier academic journals
Monthly journals
English-language journals